Nalish is a 1982 Bangladeshi film starrinf Shabana and Ilyas Kanchan in lead roles.  This film is among a series of successful films Ujjal appeared in under the direction of Mumtaz Ali.  The film's cinematographer Shafiqul Islam Swapan earned Bangladesh National Film Award for Best Cinematography.

Cast 
 Shabana
 Ujjal
 Ilyas Kanchan
 Suchorita
 Adil

Music 
All songs were composed by Ali Hossain and lyrics were written by Gazi Mazharul Anwar.
"Khodar Ghore Nalish Korte" (by Rathindranath Roy) — 5:08
"Sukher Ei Moron Fashi" (by Sabina Yasmin)

Awards and nominations
National Film Awards

References

External links

1980s Bengali-language films
Bengali-language Bangladeshi films
1982 films